Ekaterina Evgenievna Gaiduk (née Davydenko; born 8 March 1989) is a Russian handball player who plays for HC Lada.

She was part of Russia's team at the 2012 Summer Olympics.

International honours
 EHF Champions League:
 Finalist: 2007
 Semifinalist: 2008
 EHF Cup:
 Winner: 2012, 2014
 Semifinalist: 2011
 Baia Mare Champions Trophy:
 Winner: 2014
 European Championship:
 Silver Medalist: 2006
 Bronze Medalist: 2008
 GF World Cup:
 Winner: 2011

Individual awards
 EHF Cup Top Scorer: 2012

References

External links
 Profile on Handball.ru

1989 births
Living people
Sportspeople from Tolyatti
Russian female handball players
Handball players at the 2012 Summer Olympics
Olympic handball players of Russia
Expatriate handball players
Russian expatriate sportspeople in Romania
CS Minaur Baia Mare (women's handball) players